Palace of Culture is the term for major club-houses in the former Soviet Union and the rest of the Eastern bloc

Palace of Culture may refer to:

 Palace of Culture (Tolyatti), Russia
 Palace of Culture (Tel Aviv), Israel
 Palace of Culture of Tirana, Albania]
 Palace of Culture (Novosibirsk), Russia
 Palace of Culture (Messina), Italy
 Palace of Culture Energetik, is an abandoned palace of culture in the town of Pripyat, in the Chernobyl Exclusion Zone, Ukraine
 Palace of Culture (Târgu Mureș), Romania
 Palace of Culture (Iași), Romania
 Palace of Culture and Sports, Bulgaria
 Palace of Culture and Science, Poland

Architectural disambiguation pages